In molecular biology, glycoside hydrolase family 92 is a family of glycoside hydrolases.

Glycoside hydrolases  are a widespread group of enzymes that hydrolyse the glycosidic bond between two or more carbohydrates, or between a carbohydrate and a non-carbohydrate moiety. A classification system for glycoside hydrolases, based on sequence similarity, has led to the definition of >100 different families. This classification is available on the CAZy web site, and also discussed at CAZypedia, an online encyclopedia of carbohydrate active enzymes.

This domain occurs within alpha-1,2-mannosidases, which remove alpha-1,2-linked mannose residues from Man(9)(GlcNAc)(2) by hydrolysis. They are critical for the maturation of N-linked oligosaccharides and ER-associated degradation.

Glycoside hydrolase family 92 includes enzymes with mannosyl-oligosaccharide α-1,2-mannosidase , mannosyl-oligosaccharide α-1,3-mannosidase , mannosyl-oligosaccharide α-1,6-mannosidase , α-mannosidase , α-1,2-mannosidase , α-1,3-mannosidase  and α-1,4-mannosidase  activities. It includes enzymes critical for the maturation of N-linked oligosaccharides and ER-associated degradation.

References

EC 3.2.1
GH family
Protein families